David Rasche (born August 7, 1944) is an American theater, film and television actor who is best known for his portrayal of the title character in the 1980s satirical police sitcom Sledge Hammer!  Since then he has often played characters in positions of authority, in both serious and comical turns. In television he is known for his performances in L.A. Law, Monk, The West Wing, Veep, and Succession.

Early life
His father was a minister and farmer.

Rasche graduated from Elmhurst College in 1966; his grandfather was also an alumnus. Coming from "a long line of Evangelical and United Church of Christ ministers", he attended the University of Chicago Divinity School for two years, then quit. He did, however, receive a graduate degree in English from the University of Chicago.

Rasche studied acting under Sanford Meisner.

Career

Early years
He worked as a writer and teacher, including teaching English for two years at Gustavus Adolphus College in Minnesota. He performed for two years in Chicago's Second City improvisation group after studying there, and he also helped fund Victory Gardens Theater in Chicago, investing $1,000.

After Second City, he starred in the Organic Theater's 1974 production of David Mamet's Sexual Perversity in Chicago, which established the playwright's characteristic blend of earthy, sometimes brutal dialogue.

He began appearing on television and films in 1977, making his film debut in 1978 in An Unmarried Woman, directed by Paul Mazursky. The following year, he had a small part in Woody Allen's Manhattan.

He played a terrorist in the 1983 television film Special Bulletin. He appeared on the Miami Vice episode "Bushido" (first aired November 22, 1985) as a KGB agent attempting to capture a former colleague of Lt. Castillo (Edward James Olmos). During his subsequent starring role on Sledge Hammer! his character often made jokes about Miami Vice.

Rasche played Petruchio to Frances Conroy's Kate in a production of Shakespeare's The Taming of the Shrew directed by Zoe Caldwell at the American Shakespeare Theatre in Stratford, Connecticut in the mid-1980s.

Sledge Hammer!
Rasche is best known for his portrayal of the title character in the satirical television sitcom Sledge Hammer!, which ran from 1986 to 1988. The show was a spoof of police dramas and concerned the character Sledge Hammer, a violent and chauvinistic – but also somewhat clumsy – police inspector with a taste for large and powerful weaponry.

Later work
Rasche had a minor role as a photographer in the movie Cobra alongside Brigitte Nielsen.

Shortly after Sledge Hammer! ended, he played to critical acclaim in the Broadway production of Mamet's Speed-the-Plow, and he later appeared in an Off-Broadway revival of Mamet's Edmond.

Rasche was lead character Buddy Wheeler in the 1990 biker comedy Masters of Menace. He played Parnelli, one of two corrupt narcotics police officers, in the 1989 Tom Selleck crime drama, An Innocent Man.

Rasche played the role of Ted Forstmann in the 1993 made-for-television movie Barbarians at the Gate, about the leveraged buyout (LBO) of RJR Nabisco. Rasche had a leading role in the 1997 Columbo episode, "A Trace of Murder."

In addition to his work as a screen actor, Rasche can also be heard as Captain Piett in the NPR radio adaptation of The Empire Strikes Back.

Rasche portrayed Donald Greene, one of the passengers of United Airlines Flight 93, in Paul Greengrass' 2006 9/11 film United 93. He had a major role in the 2009 satirical political comedy In the Loop, as a US official pushing for an invasion of an unspecified Middle Eastern country.

Starting February 14, 2017 he played George Antrobus in Theatre for a New Audience's production of Thornton Wilder's The Skin of Our Teeth, opposite Kecia Lewis as Maggie Antrobus.

Personal life
Rasche met his future wife Heather Lupton after he moved to New York City in 1976. She has taught acting at the University of California, Santa Barbara. Lupton made a guest appearance in Sledge Hammer! as Hammer's ex-wife. They have three children. Rasche owns a house in Santa Barbara, California.

Filmography

Film

Television

Theatre

References

External links
 
 
 
 

1944 births
American male film actors
American male stage actors
American male television actors
Living people
University of Chicago alumni
20th-century American male actors
21st-century American male actors
People from Belleville, Illinois
Male actors from Illinois